The Redick Tower, operated since 2011 as The Hotel Deco, is an eleven-story building located at 1504 Harney Street in Omaha, Nebraska.  The building is listed in the National Register of Historic Places.

The building was designed in the Art Deco style by Omaha architect Joseph G. McArthur.  It was named after the Redick family, who had been among Omaha's pioneer settlers, arriving in 1856, and who had owned the land on which the building was constructed.  As designed, it housed commercial storefront space on the first floor, indoor parking and garage facilities for up to 500 cars on the lower seven floors, and office space in the tower above the parking levels.

The Redick Tower was built for Garrett and Agor, Inc., which managed it until the mid-1930s, when it was purchased by the Redick Tower Corporation.  In 1943, it was bought by Omaha investor Walter Duda, who held it until 1973, when it was acquired by the Denver-based Parking Corporation of America.  It was subsequently operated as a Radisson Hotel "considered among Omaha's best" and then as the Best Western Redick Plaza Hotel until it closed in 2009.  

In 2010, it was purchased by the White Lotus Group, which opened it in the following year as the Hotel Deco. 

In 1984, the building was listed in the National Register of Historic Places.  Its historic significance was attributed to its original multifunctional urban design, combining retail, office, and parking space in a single building; and to its being "one of Nebraska's premier examples" of the Art Deco style.

See also
 History of Omaha

References

Office buildings completed in 1930
Office buildings in Omaha, Nebraska
Hotels in Omaha, Nebraska
National Register of Historic Places in Omaha, Nebraska
Downtown Omaha, Nebraska
Art Deco hotels
Art Deco architecture in Nebraska
Commercial buildings on the National Register of Historic Places in Nebraska
Preferred Hotels & Resorts